Elections to Angus Council were held on 6 May 1999, the same day as the other Scottish local government elections.

Election results

Ward results

References

1999 Scottish local elections
1999